The Black Sea Fleet (Chernomorskiy flot) is the fleet of the Russian Navy in the Black Sea, the Sea of Azov and the Mediterranean Sea. The Black Sea Fleet, along with other Russian ground and air forces on the Crimean Peninsula, are subordinate to the Southern Military District of the Russian Armed Forces.

The fleet traces its history to its founding by Prince Potemkin on May 13, 1783. The Russian SFSR inherited the fleet in 1918; with the founding of the Soviet Union in 1922, it became part of the Soviet Navy. Following the collapse of the Soviet Union in 1991, the Black Sea Fleet was partitioned between the Russian Federation and Ukraine in 1997, with Russia receiving title to 82% of the vessels.

The Black Sea Fleet has its official primary headquarters and facilities in Sevastopol, which Russia annexed from Ukraine, along with the rest of Crimea, in 2014. The rest of the fleet's facilities are based in locations on the Black Sea and the Sea of Azov, including Krasnodar Krai, Rostov Oblast and Crimea. The appointment of the  commander, Admiral Viktor Sokolov, was announced on August 16, 2022.

History

Imperial Russian Navy

The Black Sea Fleet is considered to have been founded by Prince Potemkin on May 13, 1783, together with its principal base, the city of Sevastopol. Formerly commanded by such legendary admirals as Dmitry Senyavin and Pavel Nakhimov, it is a fleet of enormous historical and political importance for Russia. During the Russo-Turkish War of 1787–1792 Russian control over Crimea was confirmed and Russian naval forces under the command of Admiral Fyodor Ushakov defeated the 
Turkish fleet at the Battle of Kerch Strait in 1790, preventing the Turks from landing a force in Crimea.

During the French Revolutionary Wars, the Black Sea Fleet was initially deployed under the command of Admiral Ushakov, in conjunction with the Turks, against French forces during the Siege of Corfu. The victory led to the establishment of the Septinsular Republic with the island of Corfu then serving as a base for Russian naval units in the Mediterranean operating against the French.

Turkey, encouraged by the French, went to war with Russia in the Russo-Turkish War of 1806-1812. The Russian fleet (deploying from the Baltic, but joining some vessels of the Black Sea Fleet already in the Mediterranean prior to the outbreak of war) under the command of Admiral Dmitry Senyavin played an instrumental role in this conflict securing victories at both the Battle of the Dardanelles (1807) and the Battle of Athos.

After the conclusion of the Napoleonic Wars, the Russians, together with the British and French, intervened in the Greek War of Independence defeating the Turkish fleet at the Battle of Navarino in 1827 and helping to secure Greek independence (though once again, the Russian fleet was compelled to deploy from the Baltic). Turkish closure of the Dardanelles Straits then sparked a renewed Russo-Turkish conflict from 1828 to 1829 which led to the Russians gaining further territory along the eastern Black Sea.

The restriction imposed on the Black Sea Fleet by Turkish control of the Straits was influential in motivating Russia from time-to-time to attempt to secure control of the passage, which became a recurrent theme in Russian policy. From 1841 onward the Russian fleet was formally confined to the Black Sea by the London Straits Convention.

However, within the Black Sea itself, the Turks found themselves at a naval disadvantage in relation to the Russian Black Sea Fleet. In 1853, the Black Sea Fleet destroyed Turkish naval forces at the Battle of Sinop after the Turks had declared war on Russia. Nevertheless, during the ensuing Crimean War, the Russians were placed on the defensive and the allies were able to land their forces in Crimea and, ultimately, capture Sevastopol.

As a result of the Crimean War, one provision of the 1856 Treaty of Paris was that the Black Sea was to be a demilitarized zone similar to the Island of Åland in the Baltic Sea. This hampered the Russians during the Russo-Turkish War of 1877-78 and in the aftermath of that conflict, Russia moved to reconstitute its naval strength and fortifications in the Black Sea.

The Black Sea Fleet would play an instrumental political role in the 1905 Russian Revolution with the crew of the battleship  revolting in 1905 soon after the Navy's defeat in the Russo-Japanese War. The revolt acquired a symbolic character in the lead up to the Russian Revolutions of 1917 and after, as portrayed in the 1925 film by Sergei Eisenstein, Battleship Potemkin. Lenin wrote that the Potemkin uprising had had a huge importance in terms of being the first attempt at creating the nucleus of a revolutionary army.

World War I and Russian Civil War 

During World War I, there were a number of encounters between the Russian and Ottoman navies in the Black Sea. The Ottomans initially had the advantage due to having under their command the German battlecruiser , but after the two modern Russian dreadnoughts  and  had been built in Mykolaiv, the Russians took command of the sea until the Russian government collapsed in November 1917. German submarines of the Constantinople Flotilla and Turkish light forces would continue to raid and harass Russian shipping until the war's end.

In 1918, some elements of the fleet were interned by the Central Powers as a result of their advance into South Russia. In the April Crimea operation, the goal of both Ukrainians and Germans was to get control over the Black Sea Fleet, anchored in Sevastopol. Former Chief of Staff Mikhail Sablin raised the colours of the Ukrainian National Republic on 29 April 1918, and moved a portion of the Ukrainian fleet (two battleships and fourteen destroyers) to Novorossiysk in order to save it from capture by the Germans.

He was ordered to scuttle his ships by Lenin but refused to do so. Most ships returned to Sevastopol, where they first came under German control. In November 1918 they came under Allied control who later gave the ships to Wrangel's fleet of the Whites.

In 1919, following the collapse of the Central Powers' occupation in Western Russia, the Red Fleet of Ukraine was established out of certain remnants of the Russian Imperial Fleet. However, subsequently these elements were either scuttled or captured by the Western Allies. During the ensuing Russian Civil War, the chaotic political and strategic situation in southern Russia permitted the intervening Western allies to occupy Odessa, Sevastopol and other centres with relative ease.

Most of the ships of the Black Sea Fleet became part of the "Russian Squadron" of Wrangel's armed forces. Following the defeat of anti-Bolshevik forces and the evacuation of Crimea by White forces, the fleet itself sailed to Tunisia. Out of those ships, some passed to the French Navy while others were sold as scrap.

Soviet Navy 
With the defeat of the anti-Bolshevik Armed Forces of South Russia, the Soviet government took control of all naval elements. The few ships that remained in the Black Sea were scrapped in the 1920s and a large scale new construction programme began in the 1930s. Over 500 new ships were built during that period and a massive expansion of coastal infrastructure took place. The Black Sea Fleet was commanded by Vice Admiral F.S. Oktyabrskiy on the outbreak of war with Germany in June 1941.

World War II 

During World War II despite the scale of the German/Axis advance in southern Russia, and the capture of Crimea by Axis forces in mid-1942, the Fleet, though badly mauled, gave a credible account of itself as it fought alongside the Red Army during the Siege of Odessa and the Battle of Sevastopol.

Soviet hospital ship  was sunk on 7 November 1941 by German aircraft while evacuating civilians and wounded soldiers from Crimea. It has been estimated that approximately 5,000 to 7,000 people were killed during the sinking, making it one of the deadliest maritime disasters in history. There were only 8 survivors.

Cold War 
With the end of World War II, the Soviet Union effectively dominated the Black Sea region. The Soviet Union controlled the entire north and east of the Black Sea while pro-Soviet regimes were installed in Romania and Bulgaria. As members of the Warsaw Pact, the Romanian and Bulgarian navies supplemented the strength of the Soviet Black Sea Fleet. Only Turkey remained outside the Soviet Black Sea security regime and the Soviets initially pressed for joint control of the Bosporus Straits with Turkey; a position which Turkey rejected.

In 1952, Turkey decided to join NATO, placing the Bosporus Straits in the Western sphere of influence. Nevertheless, the terms of the Montreux Convention limited NATO's options with respect to directly reinforcing Turkey's position in the Black Sea. The Soviets, in turn, had some of their naval options in the Mediterranean restricted by the Montreux Convention limitations.

In the later post-war period, along with the Northern Fleet, the Black Sea Fleet provided ships for the 5th Operational Squadron in the Mediterranean, which confronted the United States Navy during the Arab-Israeli wars, notably during the Yom Kippur War in 1973.

In 1988 Coastal Troops and Naval Aviation units of the Black Sea Fleet included:

 Danube Flotilla:
 116th River Ship Brigade (Izmail, Odessa Oblast)
 112th Reconnaissance Ship Brigade (Lake Donuzlav (Mirnyy), Crimean Oblast)
 37th Rescue Ship Brigade (Sevastopol, Crimean Oblast)
 Marine and Coastal Defense Forces Department
 810th Naval Infantry Brigade (Sevastopol, Crimean Oblast)
 362nd independent Coastal Missile Regiment (Balaklava, Crimean Oblast)
 138th independent Coastal Missile Regiment (Chernomorsk, Crimean Oblast)
 417th independent Coastal Missile Regiment (Sevastopol, Crimean Oblast)
 51st independent Coastal Missile Regiment (Mekenzerye, Crimean Oblast)
 Naval Air Forces Department of the Black Sea Fleet
 2nd Guards Maritime Missile Aviation Division (Gvardeyskoye, Crimean Oblast)(three regiments of maritime attack Tu-22M2s
 5th Maritime Missile Aviation Regiment (Veseloye, Crimean Oblast) – disbanded 15.11.94.
 124th Maritime Missile Aviation Regiment (Gvardeskoye, Crimean Oblast) – disbanded 1993.
 943rd Maritime Missile Aviation Regiment (Oktyabrskoye) – disbanded 1996.
 30th independent Maritime Reconnaissance Aviation Regiment (Saki-Novofedorovka, Crimean Oblast)(Tu-22P)
 318th independent Anti-Submarine Aviation Regiment (Lake Donuzlav, Crimean Oblast)
 78th independent Shipborne Anti-Submarine Helicopter Regiment (Lake Donuzlav, Crimean Oblast)
 872nd independent Shipborne Anti-Submarine Helicopter Regiment (Kacha, Crimean Oblast)
 917th independent Transport Aviation Regiment (Kacha, Crimean Oblast)
 859th Training Center for Naval Aviation (Kacha, Crimean Oblast) 

In 1989, the 126th Motor Rifle Division at Simferopol was transferred to the Black Sea Fleet from the Odessa Military District. Also that year, the 119th Fighter Aviation Division, with the 86th Guards, 161st, and 841st Guards Fighter Aviation Regiments, joined the Fleet from the 5th Air Army. The 86th Guards Fighter Aviation Regiment became part of the Moldovan Air Force upon the breakup of the Soviet Union. The 841st at Meria airport (between Poti and Batumi in the Adjar ASSR) (Georgian SSR) became the 841st independent Guards Anti-Submarine Helicopter Regiment in May 1991 and was disbanded in October 1992.

The 43rd Aviation Sevastopol Red Banner Order of Kutuzov Regiment of Fighter-Bombers, after being included in the Air Force of the Red Banner Black Sea Fleet on December 1, 1990, was renamed the 43rd Separate Naval Assault Aviation Sevastopol Red Banner Order of Kutuzov Regiment.

After the fall of the Soviet Union
With the fall of the Soviet Union and the demise of the Warsaw Pact, the military importance of the fleet was degraded and it suffered significant funding cuts and the loss of its major missions.

In 1992, the major part of the personnel, armaments and coastal facilities of the Fleet fell under formal jurisdiction of the newly independent Ukraine as they were situated on Ukrainian territory. Later, the Ukrainian government ordered the establishment of its own Ukrainian Navy based on the Black Sea Fleet; several ships and ground formations declared themselves Ukrainian.

However, this immediately led to conflicts with the majority of officers who appeared to be loyal to Russia. According to pro-Ukrainian sailors they were declared "drunkards and villains" and they and their families were harassed. They have also claimed that their names were branded "traitors to Russia" on local graffiti. Simultaneously, pro-Russian separatist groups became active in the local politics of Ukraine's Autonomous Republic of Crimea and the city of Sevastopol where the major naval bases were situated, and started coordinating their efforts with pro-Moscow seamen. 
During this time the Georgian Civil War broke out. Fighting erupted between two seperatist minorities of South Ossetia and Abkhazia supported by Russia on one side and the Georgian government led by Zviad Gamsakhurdia on the other. However, he was ousted during the so-called Tblisi War in 1991. The new government continued the fighting against the break-away republics, but at the same time asked Russia's president Boris Yeltsin for support against the 'Zviadists' who were trying to regain power. This led to the Black Sea Fleet landingin Georgia (despite the unsettled dispute over ownership of the fleet), and resulted in the Battle of Poti.

Joint Fleet and its partition
Presidents Leonid Kuchma of Ukraine and Boris Yeltsin of Russia negotiated terms for dividing the fleet, and to ease the tensions, on 10 June 1995 the two governments signed an interim treaty, establishing a joint Russo-Ukrainian Black Sea Fleet under bilateral command (and Soviet Navy flag) until a full-scale partition agreement could be reached. Formally, the Fleet's Commander was to be appointed by a joint order of the two countries' presidents. However, Russia still dominated the Fleet unofficially, and a Russian admiral was appointed as Commander; the majority of the fleet personnel adopted Russian citizenship. Minor tensions between the Fleet and the new Ukrainian Navy (such as electricity cut-offs and sailors' street-fighting) continued.

Moscow mayor Yuriy Luzhkov campaigned to annex the city of Sevastopol, which housed the fleet's headquarters and main naval base, and in December the Russian Federation Council officially endorsed the claim. Spurred by these territorial claims, Ukraine proposed a "special partnership" with NATO in January 1997.

On 28 May 1997, Russia and Ukraine signed several agreements regarding the fleet including the Partition Treaty, establishing two independent national fleets and dividing armaments and bases between them. Ukraine agreed to lease major parts of its facilities to the Russian Black Sea Fleet until 2017. However, permanent tensions on the lease details continued. The Fleet's main base was still situated in the Crimean port city of Sevastopol. In 2009 the Yushchenko Ukrainian government declared that the lease would not be extended and that the fleet would have to leave Sevastopol by 2017.

Due to the lack of fleet facilities in Russia, the former naval area at the Port of Novorossiysk was revived in September 1994, and officially reorganised as Novorossiysk Naval Base in 1997. The Russian Federation planned to house the headquarters and the bulk of the fleet there, and undertook a major upgrade of Novorossiysk military facilities starting in 2005 and finishing in 2022.

In April 2010 President Yanukovych renegotiated and extended the Russian leasehold until 2042 and an option for an additional five years until 2047 plus consideration of further renewals. This deal proved controversial in Ukraine. It appeared to violate the constitutional ban on basing foreign military forces, and would eventually lead to high treason charges.

In this regard, relations between Russia and Ukraine over the status of the Fleet continued to be strained. In an August 2009 letter to Russian President Medvedev, Ukrainian President Yushchenko complained about alleged "infringements of bilateral agreements and Ukrainian legislation"

In June 2009, the head of the Security Service of Ukraine said that after December 13, 2009, all officers from the Russian Federal Security Service (FSB) represented at the Black Sea Fleet would be required to leave Ukraine. From then, the Security Service of Ukraine would ensure the security of the Black Sea Fleet, including Russian sailors on Ukrainian territory. However, according to the Russian Foreign Ministry, employees of the FSB working at the Black Sea Fleet facilities were to remain on Ukrainian territory "in line with bilateral agreements". In 2010, based on an agreement between the Ukrainian and Russian governments, military counterintelligence officers from the Federal Security Service returned to the Black Sea Fleet base.

Despite these differences, joint exercises between the Ukrainian Navy and the Black Sea Fleet of Russia resumed with a command-staff exercise in June 2010 after a seven-year interval.  In May 2011, Russia and Ukraine resumed their joint "Peace Fairway" (Farvater Mira) naval exercises.

Georgia in the Fleet partition
The newly independent nation of Georgia, which also hosted several bases of the Soviet Black Sea Fleet when it was the Georgian SSR, also claimed a share of the Fleet, including 32 naval vessels formerly stationed at Georgia's Black Sea port of Poti. Not a CIS member at that time, Georgia was not, however, included in the initial negotiations in January 1992. Additionally, some low-importance bases situated in the Russian-backed breakaway autonomy of Abkhazia soon escaped any Georgian control.

In 1996, Georgia resumed its demands, and the Russian refusal to allot Georgia a portion of the ex-Soviet navy became another bone of contention in the progressively deteriorating Georgian-Russian relations. This time, Ukraine endorsed Tbilisi's claims, turning over several patrol boats to the Georgian Navy and starting to train Georgian crews, but was unable to include in the final fleet deal a transfer of the formerly Poti-based vessels to Georgia. Later, the rest of the Georgian share was decided to be ceded to Russia in return for diminution of debt.

Russia employed part of the fleet during the 2008 Georgian conflict. Russian units operating off Georgia's breakaway Abkhazia region resulted in a reported skirmish and sinking of a ship of the Georgian Navy. Since the 2008 South Ossetia war the Russian Black Sea Fleet has not taken part in any joint naval exercises involving Georgian warships. However, such a statement has little meaning since the Georgian Navy has ceased to exist (early 2009 it was merged with the Georgian coast guard).

Russo-Ukrainian War

Russian annexation of Crimea

The 2014 political crisis in Ukraine rapidly engulfed Crimea where pro-Russian separatist sentiment was strong. When the Russian Government determined to seize Crimea, specialist Russian military units appear to have played the central role. In March, the Ukrainians claimed that units of the 18th Motor Rifle Brigade, 31st Air Assault Brigade and 22nd Spetsnaz Brigade were deployed and operating in Crimea, instead of Black Sea Fleet personnel, which violated international agreements signed by Ukraine and Russia. Nevertheless, at minimum the Black Sea Fleet played a supporting role including with respect to preventing the departure of Ukrainian naval vessels from Crimea. Other sources suggested that the 810th Naval Infantry Brigade of the Fleet was also involved.

After the 2014 Crimean crisis, the Ukrainian Armed Forces and the Ukrainian Navy were evicted from their bases and subsequently withdrew from Crimea. During the occupation, Russian forces seized 54 out of 67 ships of the Ukrainian Navy. According to sources from Black Sea Fleet Headquarters, inspections of all ships were to be done by the end of 2014.

On 8 April 2014 an agreement was reached between Russia and Ukraine to return Ukrainian Navy materials to Ukraine proper. The greater portion of the Ukrainian naval ships and vessels were then returned to Ukraine but Russia suspended this process after Ukraine did not renew its unilaterally declared ceasefire on 1 July 2014 in the conflict in the Donbas. According to the fleet commander Aleksandr Vitko, this happened because the vessels were old "and, if used [by Ukraine], could hurt its own people".

From that point, Russia proceeded to consolidate its military position in Crimea, which it now regards as an integral part of the Russian Federation, though this position is not one supported by most of the international community.

Strengthening of the Fleet

The Russian seizure of Crimea in 2014 changed the situation and role of the Black Sea Fleet significantly. Analysis undertaken by Micheal Peterson of the US Naval War College suggests that since the Russian seizure of Crimea, the modernization of Russian shore-based assets and of the Black Sea Fleet itself has assisted in re-establishing Russian military dominance in the region. Specifically Peterson argues: "Russian maritime dominance in the Black Sea is back. The shift was made possible by Moscow's 2014 seizure of Crimea and subsequent buildup of combat and maritime law enforcement capabilities in the region".

Prior to the annexation of Crimea, divergent announcements were made concerning the future composition of the fleet. In June 2010, Russian Navy Commander-in-Chief Admiral Vladimir Vysotsky announced that Russia was reviewing plans for the naval modernization of the Black Sea Fleet. The plans include 15 new warships and submarines by 2020. These vessels were to partially replace the reported decommissioning of Kerch,  (decommissioned in 2011 and sunk as a blockship in 2014), several large support ships, and a diesel-electric submarine. Also in 2010, Russian Navy Headquarters sources said that, by 2020, six frigates of the Project 22350 Admiral Gorshkov class, six submarines of Project 677 Lada class, two large landing ships of Project 11711 Ivan Gren class and four class-unspecified ships would be delivered. Due to the obsolescence of the Beriev Be-12 by 2015, they would be replaced with Il-38s. Sukhoi Su-24M aircraft were planned to be upgraded to Su-24M2 at the same time.

The deployment of the Admiral Gorshkov-class frigate with the Black Sea Fleet was still anticipated, though in reduced numbers. The replacement of the Black Sea Fleet's Soviet-era missile boats and corvettes with vessels of more modern design has been a priority since 2010. A similar modernization is also taking place in the Baltic Fleet and the Caspian Flotilla. Utilizing Russia's internal waterways provides the Russian Navy with the capacity to transfer both corvettes and other light units, such as landing craft, among its three western fleets and the Caspian Flotilla as may be required. Analysis in May 2022 suggested that it may be feasible for the Russian Navy even to move its Kilo-class submarines between the Black Sea and the Baltic via the internal waterways.

The projection of power into the Mediterranean has also returned as a significant role for the Black Sea Fleet with the creation of the Russian Navy's permanent task force in the Mediterranean. Both the Black Sea Fleet and the Caspian Flotilla have supported Russian involvement in the Syrian Civil War with units from the former now routinely deployed into the Mediterranean. The deployment of submarines from the Black Sea Fleet to the Mediterranean has become a routine occurrence (though the need to send them for "maintenance" in the Baltic, so as to comply with terms of the Montreux Convention, lengthens the timeframe of such deployments significantly). In late 2021 it was reported that one of the new Priboy-class helicopter assault ships, the Mitrofan Moskalenko, had been earmarked to enter service with the Black Sea Fleet in the latter 2020s in the role of fleet flagship. If confirmed such a deployment would significantly enhance the fleet's power projection capabilities.

Also significant is the build-up of Russian surface-to-surface and surface-to-air missile assets in the region. Dmitry Gorenburg of the Centre for Naval Analysis (CNA) has noted that: "Russia's expanded military footprint in Crimea allows it to carry out a range of operations that it was not capable of prior to 2014. The deployment of S-400, Bastion, and Bal missiles allows the Russian military to establish an anti-access/area denial zone (A2/AD) covering almost all of the Black Sea. By using a combination of ground-based and ship-based missiles, backed with strong electronic warfare capabilities, the Russian military can inhibit military movement into the Black Sea and deny freedom of action to an opponent if it does make it into the theater. The long-range sea-, air-, and ground-launched missiles deny access, while shorter-range coastal and air defense systems focus on the area denial mission. The result is several interlocking air defense zones".

Ongoing technological upgrades of this already robust SAM network are planned for the 2020s. Others, such as Michael Kofman of CNA, argue that while there is no A2/AD doctrine or term in Russian military strategy, Russian forces nevertheless are organized at an operational and strategic level to deploy a wide range of overlapping defensive and offensive capabilities that extend beyond just one theatre of operations like the Black Sea.

The evident American response to the dense shore-based anti-ship and air defence capabilities that Russia has developed in the Black Sea region, and elsewhere, has been to place greater emphasis on striking at potential Black Sea and other targets utilizing stand-off air-launched cruise missiles deployed on American long-range bombers. Additionally, the United States, the United Kingdom and Turkey have entered into contracts to supply new corvettes, missile-armed fast attack craft, patrol boats and unmanned air vehicles to the Ukrainian Navy.

In 2020, the Black Sea Fleet obtained seven new warships and auxiliary ships, including corvette Grayvoron, patrol ship Pavel Derzhavin, seagoing tug Sergey Balk, as well as a harbour tugs and three hydrographic survey vessels. In 2021, the same number of vessels should enter service.

Russo-Ukrainian naval standoff
On 29 January 2021, three US naval vessels entered the Black Sea for the first time in three years. On 1 February, the Ukrainian president Volodymyr Zelensky argued for NATO membership for Ukraine. On 19 March, another significant US naval deployment to the Black Sea took place, as cruiser USS Monterey and destroyer USS Thomas Hudner entered the sea on 19 and 20 March respectively. Prior to the scheduled deployment, on 12 March Russian cruiser Moskva made an exit to sea and on 19 March all six submarines of the Black Sea Fleet went to sea, which was an unprecedented event.

Russian ground forces also started a buildup on the border with Ukraine. On 2 April, Zelensky had his first telephone conversation with Biden, and on 6 April he called NATO's Secretary-General Jens Stoltenberg pressuring NATO to speed up Ukrainian path to the membership. On 8 April, Russia started moving ten of its Caspian Flotilla warships to the Black Sea. Six amphibious and three artillery boats of Serna and Shmel classes, as well as a hydrographic boat GS-599, were reported in transit, while Black Sea Fleet frigate Admiral Essen conducted an artillery exercise, usually done to raise the readiness for the amphibious landing. The same day, the US decided to send two warships to the Black Sea.

On 9 April 2021, tensions rose further and Ukraine promised not to attack the separatists, while Russia considered intervening to prevent bloodshed. On the same day, two Black Sea Fleet corvettes, Vishny Volochyok and Gravoron, conducted an exercise. The two US destroyers were clarified by Turkey to be USS Roosevelt and USS Donald Cook, while Putin stressed the importance of the Montreux Convention in a telephone conversation with Turkish president Recep Erdogan. On 14 April, the deployment of the two US destroyers was cancelled. On 17 April, amphibious ships Aleksandr Otrakovsky and Kondoponga of the Northern Fleet and Kaliningrad and Korolyov of the Baltic Fleet strengthened the amphibious warfare capabilities of the Black Sea Fleet. On 30 April, the cruiser Moskva fired a Vulkan anti-ship missile for the first time.

In November, further tensions started amidst the build-up of Russian ground forces on the Ukraine border. On 2 November, the destroyer USS Porter entered the Black Sea, followed on 25 November by the destroyer USS Arleigh Burke. In late October, the Russian Black Sea fleet held a large exercise with a cruiser, a frigate and three corvettes.

Incident with HMS Defender

On 23 June 2021, the United Kingdom's  undertook a freedom of navigation patrol through the disputed waters around the Crimean Peninsula. The Ministry of Defence of the Russian Federation and border guards said they fired warning shots from coast guard patrol ships and dropped bombs from a Sukhoi Su-24 attack aircraft in the path of Defender after, according to the Russian Defence Ministry, it had allegedly strayed for about 20 minutes as far as 3 km (2 miles) into waters off the coast of Crimea, which Russia annexed in 2014 in a move mostly unrecognised internationally. The UK military denied any warning shots were fired and said the ship was in innocent passage in Ukraine's territorial sea, later clarifying that heavy guns were fired three miles astern and could not be considered to be warning shots.

2022 Russian invasion of Ukraine 

A build-up of Russian forces around Ukraine and in Belarus began toward the end of 2021, ostensibly for exercises. In February 2022, the Black Sea Fleet was reinforced by six landing ships: three Ropucha-class vessels (Minsk (127), Korolev (130) and Kaliningrad (102)) were drawn from the Baltic Fleet while two (Georgy Pobedonosets (016) and Olenegorsky Gornyak (012)) came from the Northern Fleet. The Ivan Gren-class landing ship, Pyotr Morgunov (117) also deployed to the Black Sea from the Northern Fleet. The 22nd Army Corps (subordinate to the Black Sea Fleet) was also reinforced, including by the 247th Regiment of the 7th Guards Mountain Air Assault Division as well as by the 56th Guards Air Assault Regiment, subordinate to the same division. On the eve of the conflict, it was reported that the headquarters of the 58th Combined Arms Army had deployed to Crimea commanding between 12 and 17 battalion tactical groups.

The Russian invasion of Ukraine began on February 24 and it was initially reported that this included an amphibious landing at Odessa by elements of Russian Naval Infantry and the Black Sea Fleet. However, the report of a landing at Odessa on February 24 subsequently proved to be false. On February 24, the cruiser Moskva and the patrol ship Vasily Bykov bombarded Snake Island in the Danube Delta and captured it from its Ukrainian garrison. On February 26 it was reported that Russian forces made an amphibious assault at Mariupol utilizing half of their landing ships in the Black Sea. A second Russian amphibious group was said still to be positioned in the vicinity of Odessa.

On February 28, Turkey indicated that it was closing the Dardanelles Straits to all foreign warships for the duration of the conflict. Turkish Foreign Minister, Mevlut Cavusoglu, argued that the move was consistent with terms of the Montreux Convention. An exception would be allowed for Russian ships returning from the Mediterranean to Black Sea bases where they were registered.

As of early March the Ukrainian navy was confirmed to have lost two vessels: the frigate Hetman Sahaidachny, scuttled by its crew to avoid capture, and the patrol vessel Sloviansk, reported sunk by Russian action on March 3. On March 7 it was reported that the Russian patrol ship Vasily Bykov may have been damaged by Ukrainian shore-based multiple-launch rocket fire. However, the ship was subsequently reported as having entered Sevastopol on March 16 with no obvious damage.

On March 14, the Russian source RT reported that the Russian Armed Forces had captured about a dozen Ukrainian ships in Berdyansk. The vessels reported as captured included two Gyurza-M-class artillery boats (including Akkerman), the Matka-class missile boat Pryluky, a Project 1124P (Grisha II)-class corvette (likely an already decommissioned vessel given the absence of active ships of this class in the Ukrainian navy), a Zhuk-class patrol boat, a Yevgenya-class minesweeper, the Polnocny-class landing ship Yuri Olefirenko and a Ondatra-class landing craft.

On March 19, 2022, the Deputy Commander of Russian Black Sea Fleet Captain First Rank Andrey Nikolaevich Paliy was reportedly killed in action near Mariupol in Ukraine. On March 24, the Ukrainian military hit and destroyed the Russian Tapir-class landing ship Saratov at the Port of Berdiansk. Also it became known that Saratov has been salvaged and will be towed to Kerch, Crimea. Two Ropucha-class landing ships were possibly damaged in the same attack.

On March 30 it was reported that, as part of an operation by Russian special forces, the Ukrainian navy Project 1824B reconnaissance ship Pereyaslav was reportedly hit by gunfire at the mouth of the Dnieper river. The extent of the damage was unknown.

In other parts of March, the Russian Navy bombed some civilian ship, including a Cargo ship belonging to Bangladesh.

On 13 April 2022, Moskva, the fleet's flagship, was severely damaged after an explosion. The Ukrainian government claimed it had hit the ship with two Neptune cruise missiles. The Russian government claimed the damage was a result of an ammunition explosion. According to the Russian government, everyone on the ship was evacuated. On 14 April, the Russian Ministry of Defence confirmed the ship had sunk. On 15 April, a United States senior defense official confirmed that the ship was hit by two Ukrainian Neptune missiles about 65 nautical miles south of Odessa. On May 6 a letter from the Black Sea Fleet's prosecutor general's office to the family of one of the sailors lost on the Moskva was made public. Families will not be receiving compensation as "the sinking took place in international waters by accident".

In early May, Ukraine claimed to have destroyed two Russian Raptor-class patrol boats along with a Serna Class landing craft using a Ukrainian Baykar Bayraktar TB2 Unmanned Air Combat Vehicle (UCAV) near Snake Island.

On May 8, Ukrainian officials released footage showing the destruction of two Raptor-class patrol boats and the damaging of a third one, adding that 46 Russian crew members were killed during the operation.

On May 12, Ukrainian news media carried reports that, according to the Odesa military spokesman, the Russian logistics vessel Vsevolod Bobrov was on fire near Snake Island. Russia denied the claims. Three days later, a US-backed media outlet carried photographs of the ship unharmed moored at Sevastopol. The ship was also seen with the Pantsir-S mobile surface-to-air missile system on board while docked in Sevastopol.

On May 15, four Kalibr missiles launched from the Black Sea hit Ukrainian military facilities at Yavoriv, near Lviv. The attack was "probably" carried out by submarines. Lviv region's Governor Maxim Kozitsky acknowledged that the target was "completely destroyed".

On May 17, the Ministry of Defense of Russia reported that seaborne Kalibr missiles struck railway facilities at Starichi station near Lviv the night before. The attack was aimed at NATO weapons deliveries to Ukraine. Governor Maxim Kozitsky confirmed the damage on railway infrastructure. The command of the Ukrainian Air Defence claims the shooting down of three missiles in the area.

On June 17, Russian rescue tug Vasily Bekh was reportedly sunk due to two hits by anti-ship missiles (putatively of type Harpoon) while carrying personnel, weapons, and ammunition to resupply Russian-occupied Snake Island.

On July 31, a drone strike at the fleet headquarters in Sevastopol wounded several people and forced the cancellation of Navy Day commemorations. On August 9, huge explosions occurred at Saky airbase, destroying several fighter planes of the fleet's naval aviation. Some days later, an anonymous Western official said that "[w]e now assess that the events of ..August 9 put more than half of [the] Black Sea fleet's naval aviation combat jets out of use." On August 16, Hvardiiske airbase, a large ammunition dump in Maiske, and an electrical substation in Dzhankoi were hit with explosions, and on August 19 large explosions were heard at Belbek and Russian antiaircraft batteries were active around the Crimean Bridge at Kerch.

On August 17, Russian state media announced that Viktor Sokolov had been appointed commander of the fleet without any ceremony, apparently due to the yellow terrorist threat level following a series of explosions.

Commanders

Order of battle

The Black Sea Fleet, and other Russian ground and air forces in Crimea, are subordinate to the Southern Military District of the Russian Armed Forces. The Black Sea Fleet is one component of Russian forces in the Southern Military District and is supported by other Russian military formations in the District, including the 4th Air and Air Defence Forces Army. The Russian Coast Guard and National Guard of Russia provide additional armed patrol capabilities, which have also been expanded since the Russian seizure of Crimea to support the enforcement of Russian territorial claims.

30th Surface Ship Division

4th Independent Submarine Brigade

197th Assault Ship Brigade

Black Sea Fleet amphibious vessels being joined by five additional Ropucha-class: (Minsk (127), Korolev (130) and Kaliningrad (102) from the Baltic Fleet as well as Georgy Pobedonosets (016) and Olenegorsky Gornyak (012) from the Northern Fleet); also deployed to the Black Sea from the Northern Fleet is the Ivan Gren-class vessel Pyotr Morgunov (117); all vessels entered the Black Sea by February 9 and as of March 2022 all were reported on active operations as part of the invasion of Ukraine.

388th Marine Reconnaissance Point/1229th Naval Intelligence Center

68th Coastal Defense Ship Brigade

41st Missile Boat Brigade

184th Novorossiysk Coastal Defense Brigade

519th Separate Squadron

Auxiliaries

176th Expeditionary Oceanographic Ship Division

Black Sea Fleet Ground Forces, Naval Infantry and Surface-to-Surface Missile Forces
 22nd Army Corps (HQ: Simferopol, Crimea; subordinate to the Black Sea Fleet):
15th Guards Coastal Missile-Artillery Brigade – Sevastopol, Crimea: 3x K-300P Bastion-P anti-ship missile system (350 to 450 km range), P-800 Oniks anti-ship missile system (credited with 300 km to 600–800 km range) (Western designation SS-N-26), Bal anti-ship missile system (130 to 300 km range); targeting information provided by Monolit radar systems.
126th Guards Coastal Defence Brigade (Perevalny, Crimea) (equipped as mechanized infantry, including T-72B3 main battle tanks)
127th Reconnaissance Brigade (status/strength unclear as of January 2022)
8th Artillery Regiment (Simferopol, Crimea; self-propelled howitzers, multiple rocket launchers, anti-tank missile systems/guns)
 Surface-to-surface missile battalion (Iskander SSMs) to be added in 2022
 854th Coastal Missile Regiment (Sevastopol)
 171st Air Assault Battalion (Novostepove Crimea; subordinate to the 97th Regiment of the 7th Guards Mountain Air Assault Division, HQ at Novorossiysk, Krasnodar)
 56th Guards Air Assault Regiment (reported to be formed from the planned re-deployment of the 56th Guards Air Assault Brigade from the Volgograd region to Feodosia in Crimea; regiment has integrated and further reinforced the strength of 7th Guards Air Assault Division since December 2021)
11th Coastal Missile-Artillery Brigade – Utash, Krasnodar region: 3-5 Bastion battalions and 1-2 Bal battalions.
 Surface-to-Surface Missiles (included deployed on Crimean peninsula):
 P-800 Oniks anti-ship missile system 
 Redut
 Rubezh
 Bal
 Bastion-P including silo-based K-300S
 Object 100 Utes (near Sevastopol)
 Naval Infantry/Special Forces
 810th Guards Naval Infantry Brigade
 382nd Naval Infantry Battalion? (Status unclear as of 2021) 
 388th Maritime Recon Point (Special Forces battalion)

Black Sea Region Aviation and Air Defence Forces

2nd Guards Naval Aviation Division (Sevastopol; subordinate to the Black Sea Fleet)

 43rd Independent Naval Shturmovik Maritime Attack Aviation Regiment – HQ at Gvardeyskoye, Crimea – 18x Su-24M; 4x Su-24MR (being replaced by Sukhoi Su-30SMs as of 2019; Su-30SMs reported active with the regiment as of 2021)
 318th Mixed Aviation Regiment (Kacha): reportedly An-26, Be-12, and Ka-27 ASW and Ka-29 assault/transport helicopters (as of 2019 – Regiment may supersede/replace former 25th and 917th Aviation Regiments?)

27th Composite Aviation Division (in Crimea but subordinate to 4th Air and Air Defence Forces Army – Rostov-on-Don)
 37th Composite Aviation Regiment (Simferopol) (Two Squadrons: Su-24 and Su-25)
 38th Guards Fighter Aviation Regiment (Sevastopol) (Two Squadrons: Su-27/Su-30SM the latter with Oniks (Yakhont) supersonic anti-ship missiles) (may partly re-equip with Su-57?)
 39th Helicopter Regiment (Dzhankoi) has been equipped with Mi-35M attack helicopters, Ka-52, Mi-28N,  and Mi-8AMTSh helicopters (as of 2016).

31st Air Defense Division (HQ: Sevastopol) subordinate to the 4th Air and Air Defense Forces Army (HQ: Rostov-on-Don)
 12th Anti-Aircraft Missile Regiment
 18th Anti-Aircraft Missile Regiment 
 Five battalions with S-400 SAM systems (250–400 km range)
 S-300 long-range surface-to-air missiles with Nebo-M radars.
 Four battalions: Pantsir-S medium-range SAM
 Buk SAM system

51st Air Defense Division (HQ: Rostov-on-Don; with S-400, S-300, Pantsir, Buk SAM systems subordinate to 4th Air Army)
 1537th Anti-Aircraft Missile Regiment (Novorossiysk, Krasnodar)
 1721st Anti-Aircraft Missile Regiment (Sochi; may have started re-equipping with S-350 surface-to-air missile systems in May 2021).
 1536th Anti-Aircraft Missile Regiment (Rostov-on-Don)

7th Military Base (Primorskoe, Abkhazia – S-400 and S-300 SAMs)

Incidents
The Russian Black Sea Fleet's (BSF) use of leased facilities in Sevastopol and the Crimea was sometimes controversial. A number of incidents took place:
 For security reasons, the BSF refused to allow Ukrainians to inspect its aircraft cargo, after allegations by Ukrainians that they could be carrying nuclear weapons, which would have infringed upon Ukraine's status under the Nuclear Non-Proliferation Treaty (NPT)
 The BSF transported rockets repeatedly through the port of Sevastopol without seeking permission from Ukrainian authorities.
 A lighthouse is located on the headland which, starting in 2005, was the subject of a controversy between Ukraine and Russia. From August 3, 2005, the lighthouse was occupied by the Russian military. Despite a controversial ruling by a Court in Sevastopol on the subject, Russian military officials referred to the fact that they only took orders from the chief of the Russian Navy headquarters and no one else. Ukrainian activists complained that Sarych was illegally occupied by the Russian Navy. As a military facility, the territory around the Sarych headland is closed to trespassers with barbed wire, and the Russian flag flew over Sarych.
 In 2006, Ukrainian officials blocked Russian workers from entering the BSF lighthouse in Yalta.
 During the 2008 South Ossetia War, the Ukrainian Navy was ordered to block the entrance to Sevastopol from Russian vessels taking part in the hostilities. However, Russian Navy ships returned to base unimpeded by the sympathetic Ukrainian sailors.
 June 20, 2009 – In Sevastopol, a Russian fleet servicemen allegedly used physical force against 30 civilians. The city also alleges contract violations by the Construction Management Corporation of the Black Sea Fleet for not following through on promises to construct requested commercial housing after taking advance payment. The city began talks with the President and the Prime-Minister of the Russian Federation, Dmitry Medvedev and Vladimir Putin, and also to the Russian Minister of Defense Anatoliy Serdyukov with respect to the contract violations, but those did not yield results.
 On August 27, 2009, Russian marines successfully prevented Ukrainian bailiffs from enforcing a Ukrainian court ruling on seizing lighthouses belonging to the BSF. Russia stated that Ukrainians may not step onto its bases without permission. The Ukrainian Foreign Ministry described the Russian obstruction as a "disregard for Ukrainian legislation and international agreements".
 On April 16, 2013, a "high-ranking Russian Defense Ministry official" complained to Interfax that "Ukraine's stubborn position" was slowing the cancellation of customs payments (for the fleet) and that Ukraine still upheld (former) Ukrainian President Viktor Yushchenko's 2008 decrees that banned the "relaxed procedure" of BSF formations crossing the Ukrainian border.

See also
 Azov-Black Sea Flotilla
 Black Sea Fleet electoral district (Russian Constituent Assembly election, 1917)

References

Further reading

External links

Russia – Ukraine Lease agreement
Unofficial site 
History of the Black Sea Fleet during WWII 
Narodny Oglyadach reports on morale situation in Russian naval base in Sevastopol
КОРАБЛІ УКРАЇНСЬКОЇ ФЛОТИ (1917–1918 рр.) – Ukrainian Navy (1917–1918) 
Ukrainian Navy: ferial excursions into the past and present
Stratfor, Fwd: Insight – Russia –Black Sea Fleet focus & some sub issues  – Stratfor discussion on Black Sea Fleet, 2011
Ukraine – Historical Naval Flags (1918)

Military units and formations established in 1783
Naval units and formations of the Soviet Union
Russian fleets
Russia–Ukraine relations
Black Sea
Russian Navy
Military history of the Black Sea
1783 establishments in the Russian Empire
Military units and formations awarded the Order of the Red Banner
Military units and formations of the Russo-Ukrainian War